Beach Channel High School (BCHS) (also known as High School 410 or H.S. 410), was a high school in the public school system of New York City, located at 100-00 Beach Channel Drive in Rockaway Park in the borough of Queens. The school opened in 1973 and, as of 2006, had an enrollment of 2,175 students. The school was built on the edge of Jamaica Bay and has a private dock. It offered a College Now program, which allows students to get college credit through programs at Rikers Island,  Kingsborough Community College and Southampton College (part of Stony Brook University), while LaGuardia Community College offers classes for reading skills improvement. A separate special education school was located in one wing of the campus. In November 2009, the New York City Department of Education announced that the school may be closed in 2010 as a low-performing school.  Beach Channel High School graduated its last class in 2014. The building now houses several small schools, including the separate one-wing special education school.

Principals
 Dr. David Morris (October 2003–June 2014)
 Barbara Pleener (September 2003—October 2003)
 John Marcus, Acting Principal (February 2003–September 2003)
 Andrea Holt (September 2002–February 2003)
 Bernard Hopkins Gassaway (April 1997–June 2002)
 Sandra C. Hassan (February 1988-April 1997)
 Arthur Greenberg (September 1981-January 1987)
 Robert L. Rappaport (September 1973-June 1981)

Bernard Gassaway, principal from the late 1990s until 2002, is credited with improving the school over his tenure. He went on to become a superintendent of schools. In 2006, he published the book Reflections of an Urban High School Principal, Yo... about his experiences.

In September 2003, Barbara Pleener was installed as principal. Controversy in the form of alleged "threatening and insubordinate" comments on the part of a faculty member followed. In October 2003, allegations surfaced regarding alleged improprieties at Jamaica High School, where Pleener had been principal in 1999; she was never charged. Students and parents protested and Pleener stepped down.

Economics
On November 11, 2006, BCHS's economics program received a "Blue Star" certification for the second year in a row for its financial literacy program, as 49 of the 50 students who participated in the WISE Financial Literary Exam passed. The school was one of only 45 schools receiving certification from 139 that applied. The award, offered by the New York Financial Literacy Coalition, is a free program created to increase the number of high school students who are financially knowledgeable and literate.

Music
The Beach Channel High School Marching Band, Concert Band and Jazz  Ensemble continue to be a vital force in Southern Queens. Under the direction of Barry Domfort the bands performed at Lincoln Center for the Performing Arts, Queens College, John F. Kennedy International Airport, Forest Park, Boys and Girls High School, Brooklyn College, and Antun's.  The Marching Band performed at St. Patrick's Day, Ethnic Pride and Memorial Day parades in Manhattan and Queens and has performed at Disney World on two separate occasions. The Jazz Ensemble has performed at various local venues including Russo's On The Bay and The Beach Club.  The band has also performed for many important political figures including Bill and Hillary Clinton. BCHS has a history of great music educators, including Sidney Kolodney, Jack Nowinski, Louis Barella, Alex Leicht and Gerald Brazel.

Arts
In the late 1970s and early 1980s, the Art Department under Renee Darvin attracted a talented and diverse number of art teachers, including Bruce Degen who later went on to create The Magic Schoolbus series of children's books and television shows with Joanna Cole. Renee Darvin later went on to serve as Director of Art for the New York City Board of Education and to be a lecturer at the Teachers College at Columbia University. During their tenure at Beach Channel, the arts program offered a wide array of near-college-level courses including an after school life drawing program for advanced students.

In 2000, artist Julie Dermansky undertook a project for the Department of Cultural Affairs for New York City and decorated the fencing and floors of the day care center with works entitled Ocean Fence and Ocean Floor.

Sports
The school teams are named the "Dolphins," after the school's mascot.

Beach Channel High School has the only Crew (rowing) team in New York City.  Christian Horn is the current head coach of the team, having taken over following the retirement of William Stein, who started the team over two decades ago.  In 1983, the boys varsity team participated in the Henley Regatta in Oxford, England, with only one 8-man boat and 8 oars. Today the team has multiple racing shells; including fours, eights, a two-man, and a single shell. Since the late 1980s the team has been co-ed, made up of both boys and girls four (both consisting of five individuals; a coxswain, two "port" rowers, and two "starboard" rowers), and an eight (a coxswain, four "port" rowers, and four "starboard" rowers).   Now the team has a wide array of racing shells. In 2004/2005 the team received a brand new Vespoli 8, two brand new Vespoli 4s and 16 brand new concept 2 oars. Also the Dolphins made history by defeating the #2 rated school Curtis in the PSAL Playoffs becoming the first to do so in PSAL history. 2003 Boys Varsity Volleyball team won the Queens Division Championship, defeating Hillcrest High School. In 2004 they again played in the Queens Championship game losing to Richmond Hill High School.

Notable alumni
Jill Eisenstadt (Class of 1981) — author
 Folorunso Fatukasi — defensive end for the New York Jets.
Perry Kivolowitz (Class of 1977) — Academy Award (SCITECH) winner, business person, teacher
Jeff Scott — Professor of French horn at Oberlin Conservatory. Award-winning musician and educator.
Steven Tublin (Class of 1976) — Noted psychotherapist. Ph.D., from Stanford University.
Lauren Vélez (Class of 1982) — actress
Jay Walder — former chairman of the Metropolitan Transportation Authority.
Curt Weiss (class of 1977) — Former drummer for the Rockats and Beat Rodeo and author of Stranded in the Jungle: Jerry Nolan's Wild Ride (2017).

References

Rockaway, Queens
Public high schools in Queens, New York
Defunct high schools in Queens, New York